The Yes Solidarity for Hungary Movement (ISZOMM) is a democratic socialist political party in Hungary that was founded by Tibor Szanyi in 2020.

History 
ISZOMM was founded by a group of several left-wing politicians, such as Tibor Szanyi, a former MP and MEP of the MSZP, Szilárd Kalmár, the former leader of the Radical Left Party, and Andrea Huszti, one of the founders of the Together 2014 coalition. The party presented itself at a press conference on March 6, 2020 in Budapest, and the founders have stated that they intend to run in the 2021 opposition primary before the parliamentary election, and then compete in the 2022 parliamentary election, with plans to nominate individual candidates in 106 constituencies and to participate in a united opposition coalition against Fidesz and Viktor Orbán. Eventually they stood 49 candidates together with Munkaspart. Before the 2022 Election, ISZOMM had one seat in the National Assembly: their first MP was Sándor Székely, who had defected from the DK to join the ISZOMM in 2020.

Election results

National Assembly

References

2020 establishments in Hungary
Democratic socialist parties in Europe
Ecosocialist parties
Green political parties in Hungary
Opposition to Viktor Orbán
Political parties established in 2020
Pro-European political parties in Hungary
Social democratic parties in Hungary
Socialist parties in Hungary